Football Icon is a British television programme shown on Sky One. The programme gives young, unsigned football players between the ages of 16 and 18 a chance to win a contract with the then Premiership champions, Chelsea. Thousands of players who entered were whittled down to fourteen finalists, all of whom were put to the test at their Cobham training ground. The players were eliminated week by week until only the final three remained, when then-manager José Mourinho and his staff selected a winner.

Series 1
The first series began in October 2005, and 5,000 young footballers across the UK took part. 
The series was won by Chelsea fan Jaimie Ashley, who was attending  Forest School in Horsham, England. After five seasons in the youth team at Stamford Bridge, Ashley left the Blues in the close season of 2011.  He has gone on to play for semi-professional teams, Welling United, Worthing, Woking, Boreham Wood.

Series 2
The eventual winner was Carl Magnay. The series also included striker Moses Ademola.

References

External links

Sky UK original programming
2000s British reality television series
2000s British sports television series
2005 British television series debuts
2006 British television series endings
Association football reality television series
Chelsea F.C.
USL League Two
Premier League on television